The Church of St. Ludmila is a neo-Gothic Catholic church at Náměstí Míru (Peace Square) in Prague's Vinohrady, built on plans of Josef Mocker in 1888–1892. It is named in honor of St. Ludmila of Bohemia.

It is a brick-made three-aisle basilica with a transversal nave in the shape of the cross. The church front features two 60.5m-high towers with bells and the tall gable with portal above the main entrance with sculptures. The interior of the temple excels in a rich color windows, paintings and sculptures on which participated national artists Josef Václav Myslbek, Josef Čapek and František Ženíšek.

The church was closed due to Metro construction and later for reconstruction in 1974–1992. In 1980, its major reconstruction started. By December 1984, the restoration of the southern nave was completed, where the service of the Mass was temporarily resumed in improvised setting. On September 16, 1992, the day of veneration of St. Ludmila, the whole temple was reopened in the solemn ceremony of consecration of the new altar, which was held by Cardinal Miloslav Vlk. On September 3, 1993, the bells rang again on the towers of the church.

At present, the Christmas and Easter fairs, open-air concerts, and charitable sales are often held in front of the temple. Since 2013, the videomapping has been screened every year in October on the church during the Signal festival. The temple is open to visitors only during services.

In August 2022, the church was elevated by Pope Francis to the status of basilica minor.

References

Churches in Prague
Gothic Revival church buildings in the Czech Republic
Roman Catholic churches in the Czech Republic